Wonuarra is a locality southeast of Paringa in the east end of the South Australian Riverland region. The locality is east of the Sturt Highway between Paringa and Yamba and extends from the highway to the state border.

Wonuarra was the next siding on the Barmera railway line south of Paringa and provided bagged wheat for rail transport out of the district. The siding was originally named Koora, but renamed to Wonuarra as the original name was easily confused with Noora further south.

In the 1960s, a branch line joined the main line north of Wonuarra. The dam was never built, after the South Australian government negotiated a guaranteed supply of water from the Dartmouth Dam. The railway line was removed without ever being used.

References

Riverland
Towns in South Australia